Ingwersen is a surname. Notable people with the surname include:

Axel Ingwersen, winner of the Blue Water Medal
Burt Ingwersen (1898–1969), American college football coach
Peter Ingwersen (born 1962), Danish fashion designer
Will Ingwersen (1905–1990), nurseryman and alpine specialist of renown